Vargem is a municipality in the state of São Paulo in Brazil.

Population
The population is 10,692 (2020 est.) in an area of 143 km². The elevation is 845 m.

References

Municipalities in São Paulo (state)